Odisha is home to some well known reputed institutes in India like IIT Bhubaneswar, IIM Sambalpur, NIT Rourkela and AIIMS Bhubaneswar.

List of Notable Institutions of Higher Education in Odisha includes:

Institutes of Eminence (IoE)

Institutes of National Importance

Central University

State Universities

Deemed Universities

Private Universities

Autonomous institutes 
 Institute of Chemical Technology Mumbai-IndianOil Odisha Campus, Bhubaneswar
 Indian Institute of Handloom Technology, Bargarh
 Indian Institute of Mass Communication, Dhenkanal
 Indian Institute of Public Health, Bhubaneswar 
 Indian Institute of Tourism and Travel Management, Bhubaneswar
 Institute of Life Sciences, Bhubaneswar
 Institute of Mathematics and Applications, Bhubaneswar
 Institute of Minerals and Materials Technology, Bhubaneswar
 Institute of Physics, Bhubaneswar
 International Institute of Information Technology, Bhubaneswar
 National Institute of Fashion Technology, Bhubaneswar
 National Institute of Science Education and Research, Bhubaneswar
 National Institute of Technology, Rourkela
 National Law University Odisha, Cuttack
 Swami Vivekanand National Institute of Rehabilitation Training and Research

Medical Colleges and Hospitals

Government

Private 

 Hi-Tech Medical College & Hospital, Bhubaneswar
 Hi-Tech Medical College & Hospital, Rourkela
 Institute of Medical Sciences and Sum Hospital of Siksha 'O' Anusandhan, Bhubaneswar
 Kalinga Institute of Medical Sciences, Bhubaneswar

Ayurvedic Colleges and Hospitals

Government
Govt.Ayurvedic college and hospital, Balangir
Gopabandhu Ayurveda Mahavidyalaya, Puri
KATS Ayurvedic College, Berhampur

Private
Mayurbhanj Ayurveda Mahavidyalaya
Sri Nrusingha Nath Ayurveda College & Research Institute
Indira Gandhi Memorial Ayurveda College & Hospital

Homeopathic Colleges and Hospitals

Government
Dr.Avirna Chandra Homeopathy Medical College & Hospital
Orissa Medical College of Homeopathy & Research Sambalpur	
Utkalmani Homeopathy Medical College & Hospital Rourkela	
Biju Pattnaik Homeopathy Medical College & Hospital

Private
Mayurbhanj Homeopathy Medical College & Hospital
Cuttack Medical College of Homeopathy

Dental Colleges

Government 
 S.C.B. Dental College and Hospital, Cuttack

Private 
 Hi-Tech Dental College and hospital, Bhubaneswar
 Institute of Dental Sciences, Bhubaneswar
 Kalinga Institute of Dental Sciences, Bhubaneswar

Engineering Colleges

Autonomous
 Indira Gandhi Institute of Technology, Sarang (Govt)
 Silicon Institute of Technology, Bhubaneswar (Private)
 Dhaneswar Rath Institute of Engineering and Management Studies (DRIEMS), Tangi, Cuttack (Private)
 National Institute of Science and Technology (NIST), Berhampur (Private)

Government
 Central Institute of Plastic Engineering and Technology, Bhubaneswar
 Government College of Engineering, Keonjhar
 Government College of Engineering, Kalahandi, Bhawanipatna
 Indira Gandhi Institute of Technology, Sarang
 Parala Maharaja Engineering College, PMEC, Berhampur
 Utkalmani Gopabandhu Institute of Engineering, Rourkela
 Veer Surendra Sai University of Technology, Burla
 Sambalpur University Institute of Information Technology, Burla

Private
 Ajay Binay Institute of Technology, Cuttack
 Balasore College of Engineering & Technology, Balasore
 Bhadrak Institute of Engineering & Technology, Bhadrak
Bhadrak Engineering school for Technology
 Barrister Ranjit Mohanty Group of Institution, Bhubaneswar
 College Of Engineering Bhubaneswar (CEB), Bhubaneshwar
 Eastern Academy of Science and Technology, Bhubaneswar
Gandhi Institute of Advanced Computer & Research, Rayagada
Gandhi Institute of Science & Technology(GIST), Rayagada
KMBB College of Engineering & Technology, Bhubaneswar
 Gandhi Institute for Education & Technology, Bhubaneswar
 Gandhi Institute for Technology, Bhubaneswar
 Ghanashyama Hemalata Institute of Technology and Management, Puri
 Gopal Krushna College of Engineering & Technology, Jeypore
 Indus College of Engineering Bhubaneswar
 Kalam Institute of Technology, Berhampur
 Konark Institute of Science and Technology, Bhubaneswar
 Krupajal Engineering College, Bhubaneswar
 Mahavir Institute of Engineering and Technology, Bhubaneswar
 Majhighariani Institute of Technology and Science (MITS), Raygada
 Modern Institute of Technology and Management, Bhubaneswar
 NM Institute of Engineering and Technology, Bhubaneswar
 Orissa Engineering College, Bhubaneswar
 Orissa School of Mining Engineering, Keonjhar
 Padmanava College of Engineering, Rourkela
 Purushottam Institute of Engineering and Technology, Rourkela
 Roland Institute of Technology, Berhampur
 Sanjay Memorial Institute of Technology, Berhampur
 Seemanta Engineering College, Jharpokharia (Mayurbhanj)
 Synergy Institute of Engineering & Technology (SIET), Dhenkanal
 Trident Academy of Technology (TAT), Bhubaneswar

Management Colleges 
 Academy of Business Administration, Balasore
 Affinity Business School, Bhubaneswar
 Asian School of Business Management, Bhubaneswar
 Asian Workers Development Institute, Rourkela
 Centre for IT Education, Bhubaneswar
 IIPM School of Management, Rourkela
 IMI Bhubaneswar
 Indian Institute of Management, Sambalpur
 Indian Institute for Production Management, Kansbahal
 Institute of Management and Information Technology, Cuttack
 Regional College of Management, Bhubaneswar
 Rourkela Institute of Management Studies, Rourkela
 Sri Sri University, Cuttack
 Xavier Institute of Management, Bhubaneswar (XIMB)

Pharmacy Colleges 
Government Colleges/University
 University Department of Pharmaceutical Sciences, Utkal University, Vani Vihar, Bhubaneswar

Private Colleges
 Indira Gandhi Institute of Pharmaceutical Sciences, Bhubaneswar
 Institute of Health Sciences Bhubaneswar
Kanak Manjari Institute of Pharmaceutical Sciences, Rourkela
Sri Jayadev College of pharmaceutical sciences, Naharkanta, Bhuabneswar
Roland Institute of Pharmaceutical Sciences, Berhampur, Ganjam
 Institute Of Pharmacy & Technology Salipur

Law Colleges
 KIIT School of Law
 Madhusudan Law University
 National Law University Odisha
 Balasore Law College, Balasore
 Capital Law College, Bhubaneswar
 Dhenkanal Law College, Dhenkanal
 Gangadhar Mohapatra Law College, Puri
 Ganjam Law College, Berhampur
 Lajpat Rai Law College, Sambalpur
 Lingaraj Law College, Berhampur
 Mayurbhanj Law College, Mayurbhanj
 Rourkela Law College, Rourkela
 Xavier Law School, Bhubaneswar
Pravash Manjari Law College, Keonjhar

Autonomous/Degree Colleges

Autonomous/Degree Colleges affiliated to Utkal University 
 BJB Autonomous College, Bhubaneswar
 Dhenkanal Autonomous College, Dhenkanal
 Government Autonomous College, Angul
 Kendrapara Autonomous College, Kendrapara
 N.C. Autonomous College, Jajpur
 Prananath Autonomous College, Khordha
 Talcher Autonomous College, Talcher, Angul
 Udayanath Autonomous College of Science and Technology, Cuttack
 Vyasanagar Autonomous College, Byasanagar, Jajpur
 Deba Ray College, Bhubaneswar
 Jatiya Kabi Bira Kishore Government and Junior College, Cuttack
 Nilakantheswar Mahavidyalaya, Talcher
 Rajdhani College, Bhubaneswar
 Sadhu Goureswar College, Jajpur

Autonomous/Degree Colleges affiliated to Berhampur University 
 DAV Autonomous College, Koraput
 Rayagada Autonomous College, Rayagada
 Vikram Dev Autonomous College, Koraput
 Gunupur College, Gunupur            
  skcg ( autonomous) college paralakhemundi ganapati

Autonomous/Degree Colleges affiliated to Fakir Mohan University 
 Bhadrak Autonomous College, Bhadrak
 Fakir Mohan Autonomous College, Balasore

Autonomous/Degree Colleges affiliated to Maharaja Sriram Chandra Bhanja Deo University 
 Dharanidhar Autonomous College, Kendujhar
 Maharaja Purna Chandra Autonomous College, Mayurbhanj

Autonomous/Degree Colleges affiliated to Kalahandi University 
 Khariar Autonomous College, Khariar, Nuapada

Autonomous/Degree Colleges affiliated to Rajendra Narayan University 
 Sonepur College, Sonepur, Odisha
 Subalaya College, Subalaya, Subarnapur

Autonomous/Degree Colleges affiliated to Sambalpur University 
 Government Autonomous College, Rourkela
 Panchayat College, Bargarh

Rehabilitative Science 
 Swami Vivekanand National Institute of Rehabilitation Training and Research
 International Institute of Rehabilitation Sciences and Research

Think tanks / Research institutes
 Nabakrushna Choudhury Centre for Development Studies (NCDS), Bhubaneswar

References

Department of Higher Education, Odisha
Universities and colleges in Odisha
Education
Education in Odisha
Odisha